14th Imam Hossein Division is a division of the Islamic Revolutionary Guard Corps.

It was first officially organized as the 3rd Imam Hossein Brigade during Iran–Iraq War, just before Operation Tariq al-Qods. Its units had participated in various clashes after the 1979 Revolution, and its fighters were mostly from the Isfahan province. It was later expanded into a division. It participated in various key operations of the Iran-Iraq war.

Describing the IRGC units during the Iran-Iraq war, then-commander-in-chief of IRGC Mohsen Rezaei says:

References
 

Military units and formations of Army of the Guardians of the Islamic Revolution
Isfahan Province